Longridge is a market town and civil parish in the borough of Ribble Valley in Lancashire, England. The nearest villages are Grimsargh,  to the southeast, and Ribchester  to the southeast. The parish of Longridge had a population of 7,546 recorded in the 2001 census, increasing to 7,724 at the 2011 Census.

History
Longridge initially developed outwards from an area around St. Lawrence's Church, at the boundary of the townships of Dilworth and Alston and to the south of the modern-day town centre. Though there was a thoroughfare called 'Market Place', there was no development around that area. Most of the development of the town occurred after 1800. After this time, development occurred at a much faster pace, with expansion northwards including a mill to the north of Kestor Lane.

The demand for stone from Longridge's quarries led to the opening of the Preston and Longridge Railway in 1840 to carry the stone away, for use in such places as Liverpool Docks. The arrival of the railway led to the opening of several cotton mills and the town grew considerably larger from the mid-19th century. The mills and quarries have now all closed, although stone quarried in the town was used to construct the M55 motorway in the 1970s. One of the quarries was used as Longridge motor-racing circuit between 1973 and 1978. Longridge railway station closed to passengers in 1930, and the railway was dismantled in 1967. The station buildings were then used as offices for the parish council until 2010 when the Longridge Town Council began a project to renovate and reopen the buildings to the public with help from the Lottery Heritage Fund. Longridge railway station is now managed by Longridge Social Enterprise Company and is home to a heritage centre, the Old Station Cafe and has various business facilities available.

Community
The town is home to eleven pubs, several restaurants, a public library, and a number of primary and high schools. It is also home to an Air Training Corps squadron  and an Army Cadet Force detachment.  Longridge parish is also the location of Alston Hall, a residential adult education college operated by Lancashire Adult Learning. The local football club, Longridge Town F.C., has two senior teams and plays in the NWCFL, at Step 6 of the FA Football Pyramid. Its ground and clubhouse are situated off Inglewhite Road, behind the Alston Arms. As of 2011, Longridge had its own monthly farmers' market but has now stopped.

Sport
Longridge Golf Club is located on Forty Acre Lane on Longridge Fell.

People
John Farnworth, a freestyle footballer; Alan Kelly, footballer who played for the Irish national team along with Preston North End; Andrew Miller, who currently plays cricket for Warwickshire (all of which were pupils at the local Catholic high school, St Cecilia's RC High School). Actress Christina Chong lived here and trained at the Sutcliffe School of Dance.

Composer Ernest Tomlinson lived close to Longridge until his death in 2015. His library of light orchestral music was housed in his barn.

See also

Listed buildings in Longridge

References

External links

 Longridge Town Council Website
 Longridge Conservation Area Appraisal
 History of Longridge and District, Thomas Charles Smith (1888), Google Books (free)

 
Towns in Lancashire
Civil parishes in Lancashire
Geography of Ribble Valley